Tigran Ouzlian (born February 11, 1968) is a Greek amateur boxer of Armenian descent. He represented Greece as a featherweight at the 1996 Summer Olympics and as a lightweight at the 2000 Summer Olympics.

References

1968 births
Living people
Greek male boxers
Lightweight boxers
Olympic boxers of Greece
Boxers at the 1996 Summer Olympics
Boxers at the 2000 Summer Olympics
Greek people of Armenian descent
Armenian male boxers

Mediterranean Games bronze medalists for Greece
Competitors at the 1997 Mediterranean Games
Mediterranean Games medalists in boxing
Abkhazian sportspeople